Geoffrey Butler (born 26 September 1946) is a former professional footballer who played as a defender in The Football League between the 1960s and 1980s.

He started out with his hometown club Middlesbrough and made 55 league appearances for them before a transfer to Chelsea in September 1967. He only made a total of nine appearances for Chelsea. He later played for Sunderland and Norwich City, and whilst at Norwich he played for the Baltimore Comets of the North American Soccer League in the 1974 and 1975 NASL summer seasons, making a total of 40 appearances. He also played for AFC Bournemouth. While at Norwich, he was a member of the team that reached the final of the League Cup in 1973. In 1992, it was revealed that South Africa national team manager Jeff Butler had been sacked from his post for passing off Geoffrey Butler's playing career as his own.

Honours
Norwich City
 Second Division Championship 1971-72

References

 

Living people
1946 births
Footballers from Middlesbrough
Association football defenders
AFC Bournemouth players
Chelsea F.C. players
Middlesbrough F.C. players
North American Soccer League (1968–1984) players
Baltimore Comets players
Norwich City F.C. players
Peterborough United F.C. players
Sunderland A.F.C. players
Weymouth F.C. managers
English footballers
English expatriate sportspeople in the United States
Expatriate soccer players in the United States
English expatriate footballers
English football managers